Godfrey Ssali (born February 6, 1977) is a Ugandan football (soccer) midfielder for Ugandan Premier League club Express FC.

Career 
He began his career by Police Jinja in the Ugandan Premier League, before 2004 moving to Express FC.

International career 
He played from 2003 between 2004 for the Uganda national football team.

External links

1977 births
Ugandan footballers
Uganda international footballers
Living people
Association football defenders
Express FC players